The Mystical Seven was a society founded in 1837 at Wesleyan University in Middletown, Connecticut. Members were called Mystics. Restarted as a local honorary at Wesleyan, the society apparently continues as two rival groups.

Early history
The Mystical Seven was founded in 1837, just six years after the founding of Wesleyan University. It was recognized by the university on October 16, 1837. It was Wesleyan's first society, founded a half year before Eclectic (May 1838). Of the seven founding members, senior Hamilton Brewer was recognized as primus inter pares behind the establishment of the society. The members met each week at their meeting space in the furnished attic of Wesleyan's North College. The society began Wesleyan's first student publication, The Classic, in 1840.

The Mystical Seven is always referred to as a society, but in its 19th Century form it was one of the early college fraternities. Through the 1840s and 1850s it was a peer organization with Wesleyan's Eclectic Society, Psi Upsilon, Alpha Delta Phi and Chi Psi. However, instead of Greek references, it chose Hebraic. The I.K.A. at Trinity (1829), and Skull and Bones at Yale (1832), were other nearby non-Greek inspired college fraternities.

From about 1856 to 1865 the Mystical Seven was partners in the Alpha Eating Club with the Eclectic Society.

The society was especially known for the quality of its arcana. "Never have I seen anything so original, so quaint, so completely unique, or irresistible in its solemn humor, as the Mystical Seven initiation and the ceremonies of its meetings." A similar commentator noted that the Mystical Seven, "in some respects [was] among the most ambitious efforts at creating a college secret society with a good ritual."

The Mystical Seven also had a serious academic and philosophical aspect, including public events like bringing Ralph Waldo Emerson to speak at the campus, or later Orestes Brownson, whose address to the society was later published as "Social Reform: An Address Before the Society of the Mystical Seven".

The Mystical Seven was the first college fraternal organization to admit women, and initiated several during the 1840s. Later a law was enacted in the society that allowed the wife of a member to become initiated at that member's discretion.

The Mystical Seven expanded to several other universities. The chapters of the society were recognized as "temples", with the "Temple of the Wand" being the parent chapter at Wesleyan. In 1841, the first temple was founded outside of Wesleyan, when Mystical Seven was established at Emory University. Henry Branham brought the society from Wesleyan to Emory, and there interested the president of the university, Augustus Baldwin Longstreet, the humorist author of Georgia Scenes, in membership. Branham later became Longstreet's son-in-law. Longstreet, his two daughters, and his two sons-in-law were all eventually made Mystics. Historical accounts conflict as to whether or not the Temple of the Wand recognized the legitimacy of any of the other temples founded throughout southern universities. The Emory and Centenary temples were founded by Wesleyan Mystics, who both claimed approval by the Temple of the Wand.  The Georgia temple (at what was then known as Franklin College) was founded by George McIntosh Troup Hurt, a Mystic alumnus of Emory.  The founder of the Mississippi temple is not known, but Henry Branham – who was living in Oxford, Mississippi at the time and active in campus politics – was likely involved.

Chapters
During its first iteration, chapters of the Mystical Seven were as follows. Those that merged into other organizations are noted in bold, chapters that went dormant without merger are listed in italics.  

There appears never to have been a connection between the Wesleyan Mystics and the identically named and much later formed local honor society (1907) at the University of Missouri. Nor is there a connection between Wesleyan's Mystical Seven and the Seven Society at the University of Virginia.

Later chapter activity

Influences on other organizations
Since the Mystical Seven introduced the idea of the college fraternity into the South, it had considerable influence on the development of organizations in the Antebellum South. All private college societies were, for a time, called 'Mystic Associations' in Georgia. A competitor society called W.W.W. was designed on principles more similar to the Mystical Seven than to Northern college fraternities. It has also been assumed that a society for adult men, not connected to colleges and universities, called the Order of Heptasophs, was at least organized on principles parallel to the Mystical Seven, if not by alumni of the Mystical Seven themselves. The resemblances of the ceremonies of the two societies "cannot be given at length; but they leave little room for doubt that...the Heptasophs or Seven Wise Men...is an indirect descendent of the Mystical Seven college fraternity," according to one source.

Mystic Seven Fraternity and Phi Theta Alpha
In the early 1880s, the Virginia temple was virtually alone. In 1884, it created chapters at North Carolina and Davidson. In the following year, it reconstituted itself as the Mystic Seven Fraternity, and briefly used the name Phi Theta Alpha. This new society was led by Cooper D. Schmidt. The fraternity had lost almost all the traditions of the older society, motivating leaders of the society to reach out to Northern (Wesleyan) alumni, including Dr. Pierce, to organize a catalogue and begin publication of The Mystic Messenger in 1878, which included annual reports and stories about the history of the society.  The organization, now with four active chapters, began negotiations with Beta Theta Pi in 1888, and merged with Beta Theta Pi the following year.

Subsequent history at Wesleyan
The Mystical Seven society became dormant at Wesleyan in 1861; it had not been meeting as a society since 1858. In 1867, a petitioning group for a Delta Kappa Epsilon chapter claimed initiation into the Mystical Seven for the purposes of securing a  charter, which was successful.

In 1868, the  members formed a new society called Owl & Wand, which was to be a senior society and use the premises of the old Mystical Seven (the attic of North College). As a senior society, it took as members individuals who were already members of four-year college fraternities, and was considered an 'honorary'. In 1890, the Owl & Wand group claimed to be a direct extension of the older society. After 70 years of existence the senior society died off in the 1960s but several Mystical Seven alumni restarted the society by 1970-71. At a time when historically single-sex student groups were pressured to become coed, the new Mystical Seven embraced this change, which helped it to survive a decade that was detrimental to many other student societies and fraternities. The society, as it was rebuilt in the 1970s, has continued successfully to the present day.

During the 1980s, a separate group of students also decided to re-establish the original society. Much work was employed in reconstructing the practices of the original society including the addition of much written material from several sources. The two Mystical Seven groups clashed during 1990, (and again in 2001), in a dispute over which group was legitimate. Today, the two groups co-exist with little interaction with one another.

The meeting place of the senior society Mystical Seven on Wyllys Avenue, known as the Mystic Templum, was gutted by fire in 1995. The building remained boarded up until it was razed in the summer of 2007. The seven-sided building, with seven-sashed windows and a seven-paneled door, had been dedicated in 1912.

Notable alumni
Wesleyan Alumni, Temple of the Wand:
 Miles Tobey Granger, judge and U.S. Congressman (1887–1889)
 William Henry Huntington, Paris correspondent of the New York Tribune (1858–1878)
 Orestes Augustus Brownson, Transcendentalist author
 Robert Carter Pitman, President of Massachusetts Senate (1869)
 Samuel Nelles, first President of Victoria University in the University of Toronto (1884–1887)
 Edward Gayer Andrews, Methodist Bishop (1876–1904)
 Alonzo Jay Edgerton, U.S. Senator from Minnesota (1881–1883)
 Henry White Warren, Massachusetts legislature, Methodist Bishop (1880–1912)
 William Fairfield Warren, first President of Boston University (1873–1903)
 David J. Brewer, Associate Justice of the United States Supreme Court (1890–1910; nephew of founder Hamilton Brewer)

Other Alumni:
 Augustus Baldwin Longstreet, Temple of the Sword (Emory, honorary).  President of Emory University (1840–1848), President of Centenary College (1848–1849), President of University of Mississippi (1850–1856)
John Brown Gordon, Temple of the Skull And Bones (Georgia).  Major General, Confederate States of America.
 L. Q. C. Lamar, Temple of the Sword (Emory, honorary).  Associate Justice of the United States Supreme Court (1888–1893)
Beverly Carradine, Temple of the Star (Mississippi).  Prominent Methodist minister and author, and patriarch of the Carradine acting family.

Notes

References

1837 establishments in Connecticut
Student societies in the United States
Service organizations based in the United States